Kouilou may refer to:

 Kouilou Region
 Kouilou-Niari River